Francisco Medrano may refer to:

Francisco Medrano (footballer) (born 1983), Salvadoran football player
Francisco Medrano (poet), 16th–17th-century Spanish poet
Francisco "Pancho" Medrano (1920–2002), American civil rights activist